Henry Hird (born 1874) was an English association footballer who played as a winger.

Football career 
Born in West Hartlepool, Hird moved south to work for the Thames Ironworks and Shipbuilding Company as a plater in 1897. He was a fast and tricky player renowned for his accurate crosses and described as "an out and out right winger".

He joined Thames Ironworks for season 1897–98, his high quality crosses contributed towards the Ironworks winning the 1897–98 London League. Hird is thought to be the first Ironworks player to have been sent off. In his third game, a London League game against Leyton on 30 October 1897, Hird was dismissed by the referee for disputing the awarding of a penalty. He made just one appearance in the Southern Football League Division One and played for Ironworks until his last game on 14 October 1899. With this game, his career ended abruptly for an unknown reason.

Career statistics

Notes

References

People from West Hartlepool
Footballers from Hartlepool
English footballers
Association football wingers
Thames Ironworks F.C. players
1874 births
Date of death unknown
Southern Football League players